"Vent'anni" is a power ballad and seventh single by Italian group Måneskin. It was released on 30 October 2020 by Sony Music and was included in their second album Teatro d'ira: Vol. I. It received the double platinum certification by FIMI.

Description
The band wrote the song during their stay in London in spring of 2020, during the COVID-19 lockdowns. The lyrics were written by the band's frontman Damiano David. It is dedicated to their generation and everybody else who isn't anymore, with his mature alter ego giving advices that David "would have liked to hear from someone older now that I am twenty years old". They tackle the anxieties and frustrations of feeling like a nobody, making mistakes, the uncertainty of the future, to not think in black-and-white because "you will be someone if you remain different from others". From a musical point of view it is a melodic power ballad.

Music video
The music video for "Vent'anni", directed by Giulio Rosati, premiered on 6 November 2020 via Måneskin's YouTube channel.

Charts

Weekly charts

Year-end charts

Certifications

References

2020 songs
2020 singles
2020s ballads
Italian-language songs
Måneskin songs
Sony Music singles
Songs written by Damiano David
Songs written by Victoria De Angelis